Informe Semanal ( Weekly Report) is a weekly Spanish television news magazine broadcast on La 1 of Televisión Española (TVE). Debuting on 31 March 1973, it is the second longest-running national television program in the history of television in Spain, just behind the daily newscast Telediario, on air since 15 September 1957; and the third overall just behind TVE's Canary Islands regional musical program Tenderete, on air since 7 September 1971.

Informe Semanal is produced by Televisión Española news services and besides on La 1, it is broadcast on 24 Horas news channel, on TVE Internacional and on RTVE Play. Previous editions are also available on the online platform on demand.

With  years on air, it is referred as the milestone television news magazine in Europe and it is Televisión Española's most awarded program.

Format
The program's format is based on the American program 60 Minutes from CBS, that consists of four reports about themes as current affairs, economy, politics, society and culture. Each report lasts around 10–15 minutes.

History
Informe Semanal started broadcast on 31 March 1973, then titled Semanal Informativo and hosted by José Antonio Silva and directed by Pedro Erquicia. Since then they have issued more than 6,000 reports.

In 1978 Erquicia left the direction of the program and was replaced by Jorge Martínez Reverte and for some time the format was changed and live interviews were featured.

In January 2021, the journalist Cristina Olea interviewed former US President Barack Obama for the program Informe Semanal.

Directors
 Pedro Erquicia (1973-1978)
 Rafael Martínez Dubán (1978-1981)
 Ramón Colom (1981-1987)
 Jorge Martínez Reverte (1988)
 Baltasar Magro (1988-1989)
 María Antonia Iglesias (1989-1990)
 Elena Martí (1990)
 Ana Ramírez Cañil (1990-1991)
 Fernando López Agudín (1991-1994)
 Manuel Sánchez Pereira (1994-1996)
 Baltasar Magro (1996-2004)
 Alicia Gómez Montano (2004-2012)
 Jenaro Castro (2012-)

Hosts
 José Antonio Silva (1973-1975)
 Pedro Erquicia (1976-1978)
 Rosa María Mateo (1975-1980)
 Adela Cantalapiedra (1980-1981)
 Ramón Colom (1981-1983)
 Mari Carmen García Vela (1983-1996)
 Georgina Cisquella (1996)
 Baltasar Magro (1996-2000)
 Almudena Ariza (2000-2001)
 Letizia Ortiz (2001)
 Baltasar Magro (2001-2004)
 Pilar García Muñiz (2004)
 Alicia Gómez Montano (2004-2005)
 Beatriz Ariño (2005-2007)
 Beatriz Ariño, María Casado, Ana Blanco, Lorenzo Milá, David Cantero, Ana Pastor and Pepa Bueno (2007-2009)
 David Cantero (2009-2010)
 Ana Roldán (2010-2012)
 Olga Lambea (2012–2020)
 Marisa Rodríguez Palop (2020–present)

References

External links
  

1973 Spanish television series debuts
1970s Spanish television series
1980s Spanish television series
1990s Spanish television series
2000s Spanish television series
2010s Spanish television series
2020s Spanish television series
RTVE shows
Spanish television news shows
Spanish-language television shows